Leonard Bernstein Discusses Humor in Music and Conducts Till Eulenspiegel's Merry Pranks is an album from Leonard Bernstein and the New York Philharmonic. It was released in 1961 on the Columbia Masterworks label (catalog number ML 5625).

The work
Leonard Bernstein, at the time chief conductor of the New York Philharmonic, ran a series of education about musical topic. The topic "Humor in Music" was one of the lectures with music played by the orchestra.

On the "A" side of the album and a portion of the "B" side, Bernstein reviews the use of humor in classical music, include the use of dissonant notes, non-musical noises, "wrong notes", and musical overstatement, and the role of bassoona and the squeaky E-flat clarinet as the orchestra's jokesters. On the "B" side, Bernstein conducts the New York Philharmonic in a performance of Till Eulenspiegel's Merry Pranks, a tone poem by Richard Strauss.

The spoken portion of the album was remastered in 2013 and is available on YouTube.

Reception
Bernstein received the 1962 Grammy Award for Best Spoken Word Album for the album.

Track listing
Side A
 Discussion by Bernstein (piano by Bernstein) [22:15]

Side B
 Continuation of discussion [7:40]
 Till Eulenspiegel's Merry Pranks, composed by Richard Strauss, performed by the New York Philharmonic conducted by Leonard Bernstein [15:05]

References

External links 
 

1961 albums
1960s spoken word albums
Leonard Bernstein
Columbia Records albums